Margit Adorf (pseudonym Fagira D. Morti; born on 14 February 1974 in Tallinn) is an Estonian journalist and poet.

Works
 1995: poetry collection "Libamaailm"
 2001: poetry collection "Normaalsuse etalon" 
 2018: poetry collection "Pöörane kiskjaloom"

References

1974 births
Living people
Estonian women poets
20th-century Estonian poets
21st-century Estonian poets
Estonian journalists
University of Tartu alumni
People from Tallinn